In quantum mechanics, a rotational transition is an abrupt change in angular momentum.  Like all other properties of a quantum particle, angular momentum is quantized, meaning it can only equal certain discrete values, which correspond to different rotational energy states.  When a particle loses angular momentum, it is said to have transitioned to a lower rotational energy state.  Likewise, when a particle gains angular momentum, a positive rotational transition is said to have occurred.

Rotational transitions are important in physics due to the unique spectral lines that result. Because there is a net gain or loss of energy during a transition, electromagnetic radiation of a particular frequency must be absorbed or emitted. This forms spectral lines at that frequency which can be detected with a spectrometer, as in rotational spectroscopy or Raman spectroscopy.

Diatomic molecules
Molecules have rotational energy owing to rotational motion of the nuclei about their center of mass. Due to quantization, these energies can take only certain discrete values. Rotational transition thus corresponds to transition of the molecule from one rotational energy level to the other through gain or loss of a photon. Analysis is simple in the case of diatomic molecules.

Nuclear wave function
Quantum theoretical analysis of a molecule is simplified by use of Born–Oppenheimer approximation. Typically, rotational energies of molecules are smaller than electronic transition energies by a factor of  m/M ≈ 10−3 – 10−5, where m is electronic mass and M is typical nuclear mass. From uncertainty principle, period of motion is of the order of Planck's constant h divided by its energy. Hence nuclear rotational periods are much longer than the electronic periods. So electronic and nuclear motions can be treated separately. In the simple case of a diatomic molecule, the radial part of the Schrödinger Equation for a nuclear wave function Fs(R), in an electronic state s, is written as (neglecting spin interactions)

where μ is reduced mass of two nuclei, R is vector joining the two nuclei, Es(R) is energy eigenvalue of electronic wave function Φs representing electronic state s and N is orbital momentum operator for the relative motion of the two nuclei given by

The total wave function for the molecule is

where  are position vectors from center of mass of molecule to ith electron.
Es then plays role of a potential well in analysis of nuclear wave functions .

Rotational energy levels
The first term in the above nuclear wave function equation corresponds to kinetic energy of nuclei due to their radial motion. Term  represents rotational kinetic energy of the two nuclei, about their center of mass, in a given electronic state Φs. Possible values of the same are different rotational energy levels for the molecule.

Orbital angular momentum for the rotational motion of nuclei can be written as

If internuclear vector R is taken along z-axis, component of  along z-axis - Nz - becomes zero as

Hence

where J is called rotational quantum number and J can be a positive integer or zero.

where .

As |J| ≥ Jz, we have . So possible values of rotational quantum number are

Since molecule is in eigenstate of Lz, expectation value of components perpendicular to the direction of z-axis (internuclear line) is zero. Hence

and

Thus

Putting all these results together,

The Schrödinger equation for the nuclear wave function can now be rewritten as

where

E′s now serves as effective potential in radial nuclear wave function equation.

Sigma states
Molecular states in which the total orbital momentum of electrons is zero are called sigma states. In sigma states . Thus . As nuclear motion for a stable molecule is generally confined to a small interval around  where  corresponds to internuclear distance for minimum value of potential , rotational energies are given by,

with

Hence even for states other than sigma states, rotational energy is approximately given by above expression.

Rotational spectrum

When a rotational transition occurs, there is a change in the value of rotational quantum number . Selection rules for rotational transition are,
when ,  and

The pure rotational spectrum of a diatomic molecule consists of lines in the far infrared or microwave region. The frequency of these lines is given by

See also
 Vibrational transition

Notes

References 
 
 

Chemical physics